Margrét Rósa Hálfdánardóttir (born 2 June 1994) is an Icelandic former basketball player and a former member of the Icelandic national basketball team. She won the Icelandic championship with Haukar in 2009.

Playing career

Haukar (2008–2014)
After coming up through the junior ranks of Haukar, Margrét debuted with the senior team during the 2008–2009 season. She won the Icelandic championship in after Haukar beat KR 3-2 in the Úrvalsdeild finals.

She broke into the rotation during the 2011–2012 season where she averaged 10.0 points and 3.5 rebounds per game. For her efforts she was selected as the Úrvalsdeild Young Player of the Year. The following season, she averaged a career high 13.0 points along with 4.4 rebounds and 3.0 assists per game. During her last season with Haukar, Margrét averaged 11.8 points, 4.5 rebounds and 3.3 assists per game.

Canisius College (2014–2018)
In 20114, Margrét Rósa joined Canisius College. During her freshman season, she appeared in 29 games, averaging 3.7 points and 1.0 rebounds.

In 2015 she was joined at Canisius by fellow Icelander Sara Rún Hinriksdóttir. She appeared in 30 games and started 29, averaging 9.6 points, 2.4 rebounds and 2.0 assists per game while leading the team in three point accuracy, by making 43.6% of her three-point shots.

During her junior season, Margrét appeared in 31 games and made 30 starts. She averaged 9.2 points per game while making 39.2% of her three-point shots.

Margrét started 27 of 30 games played as a senior. She averaged 9.2 points per game and scored a career high 23 points against Monmouth on 16 February 2018.

After graduating from college, Margrét decided to step away from basketball.

College statistics

Source

National team career
After debuting with the Icelandic national team in 2014, Margrét went on to play 12 games for the team. Due to commitments 
to the Canisius College, she was unable to join the national team for most of her college career.

Personal life
Margrét's parents, Hálfdán Markússon and Sóley Indriðadóttir, both played basketball for Haukar. Her sister, Sylvía Rún Hálfdánardóttir, plays for the Icelandic national team.

References

External links
Icelandic statistics at Icelandic Basketball Association
College profile and statistics at gogriffs.com

1994 births
Living people
Canisius Golden Griffins women's basketball players
Guards (basketball)
Margrét Rósa Hálfdánardóttir
Margrét Rósa Hálfdánardóttir
Margrét Rósa Hálfdánardóttir